Minuscule 422 (in the Gregory-Aland numbering), ε 186 (in the Soden numbering), is a Greek minuscule manuscript of the New Testament, on parchment. Palaeographically it has been assigned to the 11th century.
The marginal equipment is full.

Description 

The codex contains a complete text of the four Gospels on 256 parchment leaves. It is written in two columns per page, in 28 lines per page. The manuscript was written by an ignorant scribe, who made many errors.

There is also a division according to the smaller Ammonian Sections (in Mark 240 Sections, the last in 16:19), with references to the Eusebian Canons (partially).

Lectionary markings at the margin were added by a later hand.

Text 

The Greek text of the codex is a representative of the Byzantine text-type. Aland placed it in Category V.
According to the Claremont Profile Method it represents textual family Kx in Luke 10 and Luke 20. In Luke 1 it has a mixture of the Byzantine text-families.

History 

The manuscript was added to the list of New Testament manuscripts by Scholz (1794–1852). It was examined by Dean Burgon in 1873. C. R. Gregory saw it in 1887.

The manuscript is currently housed at the Bavarian State Library (Gr. 210) in Munich.

See also 

 List of New Testament minuscules
 Biblical manuscript
 Textual criticism

References

Further reading 

 

Greek New Testament minuscules
11th-century biblical manuscripts